Nicolao is an Italian given name and a surname. It may refer to the following:

Given name
Nicolao Civitali (1482 - after 1560), Italian sculptor and architect
Nicolao Colletti (18th century), Italian mathematician
Nicolao Dorati (c. 1513 – 1593), Italian composer 
Nicolao Dumitru (born 1991), Swedish-born Italian footballer
Nicolao Fornengo (born 1966), Italian physicist

Surname
Andrea De Nicolao (born 1991), Italian basketball player
Giuseppe Nicolao (born 1994), Italian footballer
Luis Nicolao (born 1944), Argentine swimmer
Teresa Nicolao (born 1928), Brazilian artist

Other
Nicolao Atelier, Italian clothing company

See also

 Niccolao Manucci
 Nicolaos Matussis
 Nicola
 Nicolae (disambiguation)
 Nicolai (disambiguation)
 Nicolaj
 Nicolas
 Nicolau
 Nicolay (disambiguation)
 Nicolò